The 1915 VFL season was the 19th season of the Victorian Football League (VFL), the highest level senior Australian rules football competition in Victoria.

The season featured nine clubs, following the departure of  after a seven-year stint in the league. The season ran from 24 April until 18 September, and comprised a 16-game home-and-away season followed by a finals series featuring the top four clubs.

The premiership was won by the Carlton Football Club for the fifth time and second time consecutively, after it defeated  by 33 points in the 1915 VFL Grand Final.

Withdrawal of University
On 16 October 1914, three weeks after the end of the 1914 season, the University Football Club dropped out of the VFL and folded.

The reasons given for this decision were:
 Firstly, after three promising seasons in 1908–1910, University had become very uncompetitive, finishing last in 1911–1914, and losing its last 51 consecutive matches.
 Secondly, the club had found it difficult to maintain a constant lineup since the players' primary focus was on their studies rather than football, particularly during mid-year examinations.
 Thirdly, since University's admission to the VFL in 1908, player payments in the VFL had become commonplace, and were officially permitted from 1911, whereas University chose to remain a fully amateur club drawing solely from university students, which had caused a number of players to defect to other clubs.

As such, both the club and the VFL had conceded it would be virtually impossible for University to become viable and/or competitive in an increasingly professional competition. Despite the outbreak of World War I eleven weeks earlier, the war was not given as a contributing factor in University's decision, especially as the conflict was not, at the time, expected to escalate to the extent it did.

Following University's dissolution, players who wished to continue playing in the VFL were all cleared to  through an informal arrangement beneficial to both clubs: University wished to see its best players playing together in the same VFL club to retain the strength of its own team for intervarsity competition, and Melbourne, which had mostly struggled since its 1900 premiership due to the lack of a natural recruiting district (formal zoning was not introduced until the following year), gained exclusive access to a valuable source of recruits. Among those who transferred from University to Melbourne were Jack Brake, Claude Bryan, Jack Doubleday, Dick Gibbs, Roy Park, and Percy Rodriguez.

With the VFL being reduced to nine clubs, a bye was required in the fixture for the first time in the league's history.

The University club reformed in 1919, and continues to play amateur football in the Victorian Amateur Football Association to this day.

Premiership season
In 1915, the VFL competition consisted of nine teams of 18 on-the-field players each, with no "reserves", although any of the 18 players who had left the playing field for any reason could later resume their place on the field at any time during the match.

Each team played each other twice in a home-and-away season of 18 rounds (i.e., 16 matches and 2 byes).

Once the 18 round home-and-away season had finished, the 1915 VFL Premiers were determined by the specific format and conventions of the amended "Argus system".

Round 1

|- style="background:#ccf;"
| Home team
| Home team score
| Away team
| Away team score
| Venue
| Date
|- style="background:#fff;"
| 
| 8.16 (64)
| 
| 4.13 (37)
| Junction Oval
| 24 April 1915
|- style="background:#fff;"
| 
| 12.10 (82)
| 
| 11.7 (73)
| MCG
| 24 April 1915
|- style="background:#fff;"
| 
| 7.10 (52)
| 
| 3.8 (26)
| Victoria Park
| 24 April 1915
|- style="background:#fff;"
| 
| 5.11 (41)
| 
| 6.5 (41)
| Princes Park
| 24 April 1915

Round 2

|- style="background:#ccf;"
| Home team
| Home team score
| Away team
| Away team score
| Venue
| Date
|- style="background:#fff;"
| 
| 7.14 (56)
| 
| 6.18 (54)
| Corio Oval
| 1 May 1915
|- style="background:#fff;"
| 
| 14.17 (101)
| 
| 9.2 (56)
| Brunswick Street Oval
| 1 May 1915
|- style="background:#fff;"
| 
| 4.6 (30)
| 
| 12.11 (83)
| Punt Road Oval
| 1 May 1915
|- style="background:#fff;"
| 
| 6.11 (47)
| 
| 8.12 (60)
| Lake Oval
| 1 May 1915

Round 3

|- style="background:#ccf;"
| Home team
| Home team score
| Away team
| Away team score
| Venue
| Date
|- style="background:#fff;"
| 
| 9.15 (69)
| 
| 8.19 (67)
| Punt Road Oval
| 8 May 1915
|- style="background:#fff;"
| 
| 4.10 (34)
| 
| 16.6 (102)
| EMCG
| 8 May 1915
|- style="background:#fff;"
| 
| 15.12 (102)
| 
| 12.11 (83)
| MCG
| 8 May 1915
|- style="background:#fff;"
| 
| 7.14 (56)
| 
| 10.16 (76)
| Junction Oval
| 8 May 1915

Round 4

|- style="background:#ccf;"
| Home team
| Home team score
| Away team
| Away team score
| Venue
| Date
|- style="background:#fff;"
| 
| 4.10 (34)
| 
| 10.11 (71)
| Corio Oval
| 15 May 1915
|- style="background:#fff;"
| 
| 5.19 (49)
| 
| 2.6 (18)
| Brunswick Street Oval
| 15 May 1915
|- style="background:#fff;"
| 
| 9.13 (67)
| 
| 5.9 (39)
| Victoria Park
| 15 May 1915
|- style="background:#fff;"
| 
| 3.13 (31)
| 
| 8.8 (56)
| Princes Park
| 15 May 1915

Round 5

|- style="background:#ccf;"
| Home team
| Home team score
| Away team
| Away team score
| Venue
| Date
|- style="background:#fff;"
| 
| 7.10 (52)
| 
| 6.4 (40)
| EMCG
| 22 May 1915
|- style="background:#fff;"
| 
| 8.14 (62)
| 
| 3.12 (30)
| Victoria Park
| 22 May 1915
|- style="background:#fff;"
| 
| 8.8 (56)
| 
| 6.4 (40)
| Lake Oval
| 22 May 1915
|- style="background:#fff;"
| 
| 8.3 (51)
| 
| 10.12 (72)
| MCG
| 22 May 1915

Round 6

|- style="background:#ccf;"
| Home team
| Home team score
| Away team
| Away team score
| Venue
| Date
|- style="background:#fff;"
| 
| 8.7 (55)
| 
| 8.16 (64)
| EMCG
| 29 May 1915
|- style="background:#fff;"
| 
| 9.11 (65)
| 
| 13.11 (89)
| Junction Oval
| 29 May 1915
|- style="background:#fff;"
| 
| 7.12 (54)
| 
| 8.12 (60)
| Punt Road Oval
| 29 May 1915
|- style="background:#fff;"
| 
| 5.10 (40)
| 
| 9.13 (67)
| Corio Oval
| 29 May 1915

Round 7

|- style="background:#ccf;"
| Home team
| Home team score
| Away team
| Away team score
| Venue
| Date
|- style="background:#fff;"
| 
| 12.6 (78)
| 
| 12.8 (80)
| EMCG
| 5 June 1915
|- style="background:#fff;"
| 
| 11.9 (75)
| 
| 10.13 (73)
| Princes Park
| 5 June 1915
|- style="background:#fff;"
| 
| 7.6 (48)
| 
| 5.20 (50)
| Punt Road Oval
| 7 June 1915
|- style="background:#fff;"
| 
| 7.5 (47)
| 
| 10.8 (68)
| Lake Oval
| 7 June 1915

Round 8

|- style="background:#ccf;"
| Home team
| Home team score
| Away team
| Away team score
| Venue
| Date
|- style="background:#fff;"
| 
| 15.17 (107)
| 
| 8.5 (53)
| Princes Park
| 12 June 1915
|- style="background:#fff;"
| 
| 14.17 (101)
| 
| 13.5 (83)
| Lake Oval
| 12 June 1915
|- style="background:#fff;"
| 
| 10.12 (72)
| 
| 6.17 (53)
| MCG
| 12 June 1915
|- style="background:#fff;"
| 
| 6.14 (50)
| 
| 11.8 (74)
| Brunswick Street Oval
| 12 June 1915

Round 9

|- style="background:#ccf;"
| Home team
| Home team score
| Away team
| Away team score
| Venue
| Date
|- style="background:#fff;"
| 
| 5.6 (36)
| 
| 5.8 (38)
| EMCG
| 19 June 1915
|- style="background:#fff;"
| 
| 5.13 (43)
| 
| 3.10 (28)
| Victoria Park
| 19 June 1915
|- style="background:#fff;"
| 
| 4.12 (36)
| 
| 10.12 (72)
| Corio Oval
| 19 June 1915
|- style="background:#fff;"
| 
| 1.1 (7)
| 
| 5.15 (45)
| Junction Oval
| 19 June 1915

Round 10

|- style="background:#ccf;"
| Home team
| Home team score
| Away team
| Away team score
| Venue
| Date
|- style="background:#fff;"
| 
| 9.11 (65)
| 
| 7.5 (47)
| Lake Oval
| 26 June 1915
|- style="background:#fff;"
| 
| 8.12 (60)
| 
| 10.11 (71)
| Punt Road Oval
| 26 June 1915
|- style="background:#fff;"
| 
| 5.12 (42)
| 
| 11.12 (78)
| EMCG
| 26 June 1915
|- style="background:#fff;"
| 
| 7.8 (50)
| 
| 5.8 (38)
| Brunswick Street Oval
| 26 June 1915

Round 11

|- style="background:#ccf;"
| Home team
| Home team score
| Away team
| Away team score
| Venue
| Date
|- style="background:#fff;"
| 
| 10.20 (80)
| 
| 6.7 (43)
| Victoria Park
| 3 July 1915
|- style="background:#fff;"
| 
| 7.15 (57)
| 
| 7.5 (47)
| Princes Park
| 3 July 1915
|- style="background:#fff;"
| 
| 12.17 (89)
| 
| 8.7 (55)
| Junction Oval
| 3 July 1915
|- style="background:#fff;"
| 
| 12.13 (85)
| 
| 10.13 (73)
| MCG
| 3 July 1915

Round 12

|- style="background:#ccf;"
| Home team
| Home team score
| Away team
| Away team score
| Venue
| Date
|- style="background:#fff;"
| 
| 5.9 (39)
| 
| 11.13 (79)
| Corio Oval
| 10 July 1915
|- style="background:#fff;"
| 
| 17.20 (122)
| 
| 3.6 (24)
| Victoria Park
| 10 July 1915
|- style="background:#fff;"
| 
| 10.12 (72)
| 
| 7.11 (53)
| Lake Oval
| 10 July 1915
|- style="background:#fff;"
| 
| 6.12 (48)
| 
| 5.5 (35)
| Brunswick Street Oval
| 10 July 1915

Round 13

|- style="background:#ccf;"
| Home team
| Home team score
| Away team
| Away team score
| Venue
| Date
|- style="background:#fff;"
| 
| 12.15 (87)
| 
| 12.7 (79)
| Punt Road Oval
| 17 July 1915
|- style="background:#fff;"
| 
| 7.7 (49)
| 
| 14.14 (98)
| Junction Oval
| 17 July 1915
|- style="background:#fff;"
| 
| 8.6 (54)
| 
| 12.21 (93)
| MCG
| 17 July 1915
|- style="background:#fff;"
| 
| 5.15 (45)
| 
| 12.15 (87)
| EMCG
| 17 July 1915

Round 14

|- style="background:#ccf;"
| Home team
| Home team score
| Away team
| Away team score
| Venue
| Date
|- style="background:#fff;"
| 
| 8.6 (54)
| 
| 7.6 (48)
| Brunswick Street Oval
| 24 July 1915
|- style="background:#fff;"
| 
| 11.8 (74)
| 
| 5.15 (45)
| Princes Park
| 24 July 1915
|- style="background:#fff;"
| 
| 10.10 (70)
| 
| 3.13 (31)
| Junction Oval
| 24 July 1915
|- style="background:#fff;"
| 
| 7.9 (51)
| 
| 13.13 (91)
| Corio Oval
| 24 July 1915

Round 15

|- style="background:#ccf;"
| Home team
| Home team score
| Away team
| Away team score
| Venue
| Date
|- style="background:#fff;"
| 
| 9.19 (73)
| 
| 7.6 (48)
| MCG
| 31 July 1915
|- style="background:#fff;"
| 
| 18.17 (125)
| 
| 7.7 (49)
| Brunswick Street Oval
| 31 July 1915
|- style="background:#fff;"
| 
| 9.20 (74)
| 
| 8.12 (60)
| Princes Park
| 31 July 1915
|- style="background:#fff;"
| 
| 13.19 (97)
| 
| 6.4 (40)
| Lake Oval
| 31 July 1915

Round 16

|- style="background:#ccf;"
| Home team
| Home team score
| Away team
| Away team score
| Venue
| Date
|- style="background:#fff;"
| 
| 4.12 (36)
| 
| 5.13 (43)
| MCG
| 7 August 1915
|- style="background:#fff;"
| 
| 6.18 (54)
| 
| 4.6 (30)
| Junction Oval
| 7 August 1915
|- style="background:#fff;"
| 
| 7.11 (53)
| 
| 6.9 (45)
| Corio Oval
| 7 August 1915
|- style="background:#fff;"
| 
| 9.8 (62)
| 
| 9.9 (63)
| Victoria Park
| 7 August 1915

Round 17

|- style="background:#ccf;"
| Home team
| Home team score
| Away team
| Away team score
| Venue
| Date
|- style="background:#fff;"
| 
| 7.10 (52)
| 
| 10.14 (74)
| Corio Oval
| 14 August 1915
|- style="background:#fff;"
| 
| 10.15 (75)
| 
| 7.14 (56)
| EMCG
| 14 August 1915
|- style="background:#fff;"
| 
| 8.13 (61)
| 
| 8.11 (59)
| Victoria Park
| 14 August 1915
|- style="background:#fff;"
| 
| 7.7 (49)
| 
| 17.15 (117)
| Punt Road Oval
| 14 August 1915

Round 18

|- style="background:#ccf;"
| Home team
| Home team score
| Away team
| Away team score
| Venue
| Date
|- style="background:#fff;"
| 
| 18.13 (121)
| 
| 4.7 (31)
| Brunswick Street Oval
| 21 August 1915
|- style="background:#fff;"
| 
| 14.16 (100)
| 
| 6.8 (44)
| Princes Park
| 21 August 1915
|- style="background:#fff;"
| 
| 14.15 (99)
| 
| 6.11 (47)
| Punt Road Oval
| 21 August 1915
|- style="background:#fff;"
| 
| 4.9 (33)
| 
| 7.9 (51)
| Lake Oval
| 21 August 1915

Ladder

Finals

All of the 1915 finals were played at the MCG so the home team in the semi-finals and Preliminary Final is purely the higher ranked team from the ladder but in the Grand Final the home team was the team that won the Preliminary Final.

Semi finals

|- style="background:#ccf;"
| Home team
| Score
| Away team
| Score
| Venue
| Date
|- style="background:#fff;"
| 
| 11.12 (78)
| 
| 10.7 (67)
| MCG
| 28 August
|- style="background:#fff;"
| Fitzroy
| 9.16 (70)
| Collingwood
| 4.12 (36)
| MCG
| 4 September

Preliminary Final

|- style="background:#ccf;"
| Home team
| Score
| Away team
| Score
| Venue
| Date
|- style="background:#fff;"
| 
| 6.18 (54)
| Fitzroy
| 5.8 (38)
| MCG
| 11 September

Grand final

Carlton defeated Collingwood 11.12 (78) to 6.9 (45), in front of a crowd of 39,343 people. (For an explanation of scoring see Australian rules football).

Awards
 The 1915 VFL Premiership team was Carlton.
 The VFL's leading goalkicker were Dick Lee of Collingwood and Jimmy Freake of Fitzroy with 66 goals each.
 Geelong took the "wooden spoon" in 1915.

Notable events
 Prior to the season, VFL delegates voted in favour of rule changes to bring the game closer to a hybridisation of Australian rules football and rugby league: specifically the addition of a crossbar to the goal posts over which goals were to be kicked, disallowing forward handpasses, and rules to allow stronger rugby-style tackling between the shoulders and the hips. The rules could not come into immediate effect as they required approval at a vote of Australasian Football Council delegates, and this vote never took place due to the war, so none of these changes were ever implemented.
 The first round of the 1915 was played on Saturday 24 April 1915, one day before the forces of the Australian and New Zealand Army Corps landed at ANZAC Cove in their first hostile action in World War I.
 St Kilda changed its traditional colours of red, white, and black, the colours of the enemy (the German Empire) to red, yellow, and black, the colours of a trusted ally (The Kingdom of Belgium).
 On 12 March 1915, responding to intense public pressure, a motion was put to a VFL meeting (proposed by the Geelong delegate, seconded by the Melbourne delegate) to suspend the VFL competition for the entire season (in March 1915, nobody expected the war to last for as long as it did). The votes were Geelong, Melbourne, Essendon, St Kilda, and South Melbourne "for", and the inner-Melbourne clubs of Carlton, Fitzroy, Collingwood, and Richmond "against". In the absence of the required three-quarters majority, the motion was lost.
 At the instigation of the SAFL, interstate matches were suspended.
 At 2:00PM on Saturday 29 May 1915, Essendon centreman and 1914 Victorian State wingman, Cyril Gove, rode the racehorse Menthe into third place in the Springbank Corinthian Handicap. a race for amateur riders, at Moonee Valley Racecourse. Immediately the race was over, he caught a fast cab down Mount Alexander Road, Melbourne to the East Melbourne Cricket Ground, where he played a full game for Essendon in its round 6 match against South Melbourne.

Footnotes

References
 Maplestone, M., Flying Higher: History of the Essendon Football Club 1872–1996, Essendon Football Club, (Melbourne), 1996. 
 Rogers, S. & Brown, A., Every Game Ever Played: VFL/AFL Results 1897–1997 (Sixth Edition), Viking Books, (Ringwood), 1998. 
 Ross, J. (ed), 100 Years of Australian Football 1897–1996: The Complete Story of the AFL, All the Big Stories, All the Great Pictures, All the Champions, Every AFL Season Reported, Viking, (Ringwood), 1996.

External links
 1915 Season - AFL Tables

Australian Football League seasons
VFL season